Scott Leatherbarrow is an English rugby league footballer who plays for Workington Town in Betfred League 1. His position is scrum-half.

He has previously played for the London Broncos, Wigan Warriors, South Wales Scorpions, Keighley Cougars and Batley Bulldogs where he scored 307 points in 53 games for the Bulldogs.

References

External links
Workington Town profile
Oldham R.L.F.C. profile
Batley Bulldogs profile

1990 births
Living people
Batley Bulldogs players
English rugby league players
Hemel Stags players
Keighley Cougars players
London Broncos players
Oldham R.L.F.C. players
Rugby league hookers
Rugby league five-eighths
Rugby league halfbacks
Rugby league players from Wigan
South Wales Scorpions players
Workington Town players